In physics, an oscillon is a soliton-like phenomenon that occurs in granular and other dissipative media. Oscillons in granular media result from vertically vibrating a plate with a layer of uniform particles placed freely on top. When the sinusoidal vibrations are of the correct amplitude and frequency and the layer of sufficient thickness, a localized wave, referred to as an oscillon, can be formed by locally disturbing the particles. This meta-stable state will remain for a long time (many hundreds of thousands of oscillations) in the absence of further perturbation. An oscillon changes form with each collision of the grain layer and the plate, switching between a peak that projects above the grain layer to a crater like depression with a small rim. This self-sustaining state was named by analogy with the soliton, which is a localized wave that maintains its integrity as it moves. Whereas solitons occur as travelling waves in a fluid or as electromagnetic waves in a waveguide oscillons may be stationary.

Oscillons of opposite phase will attract over short distances and form 'bonded' pairs. Oscillons of like phase repel. Oscillons have been observed forming 'molecule' like structures and long chains.  In comparison, solitons do not form bound states.
 
Stable interacting localized waves with subharmonic response were discovered and named oscillons at The University of Texas at Austin. Solitary bursts had been reported earlier in a quasi-two-dimensional grain layer at the University of Paris, but these transient events were unstable and no bonding interaction or subharmonic response was reported.

The cause of this phenomenon is currently under debate; the most likely connection is with the mathematical theory of chaos and may give insights into the way patterns in sand form.

The experimental procedure is similar to that used to form  Chladni figures of sand on a vibrating plate. Researchers realized that these figures say more about the vibrational modes of the plate than the response of the sand and created an experimental set-up that minimized outside effects, using a shallow layer of brass balls in a vacuum and a rigid plate . When they vibrated the plate at critical amplitude, they found that the balls formed a localized vibrating structure when perturbed which lasted indefinitely.

Oscillons have also been experimentally observed in thin parametrically vibrated layers of viscous fluid and colloidal suspensions.  Oscillons have been associated with Faraday waves because they require similar resonance conditions.

Nonlinear electrostatic oscillations on a plasma boundary can also appear in the form of oscillons. This was discovered in 1989.

See also
Cymatics

References

Further reading
 Philip Ball (1999), The Self-Made Tapestry: Pattern Formation in Nature, Oxford University Press.

Chaos theory
Solitons